Otto Henry may refer to:
 Otto Henry, Elector Palatine
 Otto Henry, Count Palatine of Sulzbach
 Otto Henry (sailor), Australian sailor

See also